The Church Hill Industrial District is an industrial historic district on the west side of Pawtucket, Rhode Island.  It encompasses an area that was intensively developed between about 1850 and 1920, and includes five separate industrial facilities.  Four of these are relatively modest in size (as compared to Pawtucket's largest mills), and originally served a combination of textile mills and ironworks, the latter of which often manufactured parts used in the textile manufacturing processes.  The oldest building is an 1848 ironworks facility, which runs along Pine Street between Main and Bayley.  The largest single complex, added in the 2011 expansion of the district, is the Union Waddell complex between Bayley Street and the Amtrak railroad tracks, which has ten surviving buildings from the early 20th century.

The district was added to the National Register of Historic Places in 1982, and enlarged in 2011.

See also
National Register of Historic Places in Pawtucket, Rhode Island

References

Historic districts in Providence County, Rhode Island
Buildings and structures in Pawtucket, Rhode Island
National Register of Historic Places in Pawtucket, Rhode Island
Historic districts on the National Register of Historic Places in Rhode Island